Chinese people in Finland form one of the largest immigrant groups in Finland. As of 2018 there were 12,407 speakers of Chinese in Finland. About 60% of them reside in the Capital Region (Helsinki, Espoo, Vantaa and Kauniainen). As of 2018 there were 9,230 Chinese citizens living in Finland. From 1990 to 2017, a total number of 2,460 Chinese citizens had been granted Finnish citizenship.

Notable Finnish people of Chinese descent

See also 
 China–Finland relations

References

Ethnic groups in Finland
Finland